The Military Police of the Ministry of Defense of Azerbaijan is the military police branch of the Republic of Azerbaijan.

Overview
It was established on 10 April 1992 by the order of the Minister of Defense.

Action during the Karabakh conflict 
The military police personnel took an active part during Operation Iron Fist in 2020. Military police were involved in ensuring security in human settlements and places of deployment in the liberated territories. They also served at mobile checkpoints on military transport movement routes. Cargo of the Russian peacekeepers in Nagorno-Karabakh were escorted by the military police through the Barda-Agdam-Khankendi route.

List of commanders 
 Colonel Rovshan Maharramov (-2010)
 Badir Hasanov (2010-?)

See also
 Military Police (Russia)
 032 Military Unit
 Military Police (Kazakhstan)

References

Military provosts
Military police
Military units and formations of Azerbaijan
Military units and formations established in 1992
1992 establishments in Azerbaijan
Gendarmerie
Azerbaijan